Curtis Joseph Marsh Sr. (born November 24, 1970) is a former gridiron football wide receiver who played for three seasons in the National Football League and two seasons in the Canadian Football League. He was drafted by the Jacksonville Jaguars in the seventh round (219th overall) of the 1995 NFL Draft, and played for the team for two seasons. He played for the Pittsburgh Steelers in 1997. He played for the Saskatchewan Roughriders from 2000−2001, and was named a CFL All-Star following the 2000 season. He played college football at Utah. He attended Royal High School in Simi Valley, California.

Marsh's son Curtis Marsh Jr. is a cornerback. Another son, Cassius Marsh, is a defensive end for the Chicago Bears.

References

1970 births
Living people
Players of American football from California
American football wide receivers
Moorpark Raiders football players
People from Simi Valley, California
Utah Utes football players
Jacksonville Jaguars players
Pittsburgh Steelers players
Saskatchewan Roughriders players
Sportspeople from Ventura County, California
Canadian football wide receivers